The 1931 Ice Hockey World Championship was the fifth World Championship, an annual international ice hockey tournament. It took place between 1 and 8 February 1931 in Krynica, Poland. The tournament was won by Canada who were represented by the University of Manitoba Grads team, claiming their fifth world championship title by finishing on top of the group in the final round with a total of nine points. The United States finished second to win the silver medal, losing only one game to Canada and Austria finished third for the bronze medal. The host nation of Poland finished fourth at the tournament after winning one game, tying one, and losing three in the final round.

The World Championship also acted simultaneously as the 15th European Championship. Austria who finished highest of the European teams in third were named the champions.

First round
Four teams compete in the First round each playing one game. The winning teams advance to the Second round and the losing teams compete in the consolation round.

Second round
Eight teams compete in the Second round each playing one game. The winning teams advance to the Final round and the losing teams compete in the Third round.

Third round
The four losing teams from the Second round compete in the Third round each playing one game. The winning teams advance to the Final round and the losing teams compete in the consolation round.

Final round
The six participating teams played a round-robin, with the top three teams winning gold, silver and bronze respectively. Canada's University of Manitoba Grads won the tournament with a total of nine points after winning four games and tying one. Sweden's 0 – 0 tie with Canada was the first time a European team did not lose to a team representing Canada in a World Championship match. Due to a tie between Czechoslovakia and Poland in points, fourth spot was given to Poland who had more total goals scored.

consolation round
The four participating teams played a round-robin, with games played between February 4 to February 7. The winner Hungary won all three games, finishing with six points and earning sixth place in the overall standings.

15th European Championship
The 1931 World Championship also acted simultaneously as the 15th European Championships. Austria were named champions after finishing as the highest ranked European team in the tournament in third. Second and third were awarded to Poland and Czechoslovakia respectively.

Austrian winning team

Herbert Brück, Friedrich Demmer, Jacques Dietrichstein, Anton Emhardt, Josef Göbl, Bruno Kahane, Karl Kirchberger, Ulrich Lederer, Walter Sell, Hans Tatzer, Hans Trauttenberg, Hermann Weiß

Medal table

Müller presents the European standings as not including the 'consolation round,' so the placement of the last four nations differ from the 'World' standings.

Ranking and statistics

Final standings
The final standings of the tournament:

Top scorer
 Charles Ramsay – 8 goals

Canadian winning team
George Garbutt, George Hill, Sammy McCallum, Gord McKenzie, Ward McVey, Frank Morris, Jack Pidcock, Art Putee, Blake Watson, Guy Williamson

References

Complete results

Men's World Championships
IIHF Men's World Ice Hockey Championships
International ice hockey competitions hosted by Poland
1930–31 in Polish ice hockey
February 1931 sports events